The electoral district of Sandringham is one of the electoral districts of Victoria, Australia, for the Victorian Legislative Assembly.  It consists of the Melbourne bayside suburbs of Beaumaris, Black Rock and Sandringham, and parts of Cheltenham, Hampton, Highett, and Mentone.

Since the seat was created in 1955, it has been held by the Liberal Party, except for the period 1982-5 when it was held by the Labor Party. The seat is currently held by Brad Rowswell of the Liberal Party with a margin of 5.1%. The Liberal Party experienced a swing towards it at the 2022 Victorian state election.

Members for Sandringham

Election results

References

External links
 Electorate profile: Sandringham District, Victorian Electoral Commission

Electoral districts of Victoria (Australia)
1955 establishments in Australia
City of Bayside
City of Kingston (Victoria)
Electoral districts and divisions of Greater Melbourne